Qeshlaq-e Melli may refer to:
Qeshlaq-e Melli Hajji Hamat
Qeshlaq-e Melli Mahmudlar